The New York International Auto Show is an annual auto show that is held in Manhattan in late March or early April. It is held at the Jacob Javits Convention Center.  It usually opens on or just before Easter weekend and closes on the first Sunday after Easter. In 2018, the NYIAS took place from March 30 through April 8.

The show has been held annually since 1900. It was the first automotive exhibition in North America.

The show was held at the New York Coliseum from 1956 to 1987 when the show moved to the Javits Center.

Before the show opens every year, several auto companies debut new production and concept vehicles for the press.  In addition, the Greater New York Auto Dealers Association (GNYADA) and the International Motor Press Association (IMPA) host corporate meetings and events.  The World Car Awards typically announces its annual award winners as part of these events.

In addition to individual programs during the show, there are automobile related conferences, forums, symposiums, and other gatherings. The ten day event contribution to economy of the City and State is estimated to be in the hundreds of millions of dollars.

2022
The 2022 show was held from April 15–24, with press preview days on April 13 and 14. This year marked the first time the auto show contained micromobility exhibits.

Production car introductions

World debuts

 2022 Ford GT Holman Moody Heritage Edition
 2023 Hyundai Palisade (refresh)
 2022 Jeep Grand Cherokee High Altitude 4xe
 2023 (Jeep) Wagoneer L, Grand Wagoneer L
 2023 Kia Telluride (refresh)
 2023 Nissan Leaf (refresh)
 2023 Nissan Pathfinder Rock Creek
 2023 Subaru Outback (refresh)
 VinFast VF 7, VF 8, VF 9 (auto show debuts)
 Volkswagen ID. Buzz (Euro-spec, auto show debut)

North American debuts

 2023 Kia Niro

Concept car introductions
 Chrysler Airflow Granite Concept
 Indi One

2021
The 2021 show was scheduled to take place from August 20–29, 2021.  However, it was again canceled, due to COVID-19 Delta variant.

2020
The 2020 show was previous scheduled to be held from August 28 through September 6, with press preview days on August 26 and 27. It was originally scheduled for April 10 through 19, but on March 10, it was postponed to late August due to the coronavirus pandemic. Planned introductions included the production Lucid Air and a hydrogen-powered supercar from newcomer Hyperion Motors.

On May 22, 2020, the organizers announced that the 2020 show would be canceled due to the Convention Center continuing to be used as an active makeshift hospital, with the Center being on standby for the foreseeable future. They also announced that the organizers would focus on the 2021 show instead.

2019
The 2019 show was held from April 19 through April 28, with press preview days on April 17 and 18.

Production car introductions

World debuts

 2020 Acura TLX PMC Edition 
 2020 Cadillac CT5
 2019 Dodge Challenger, Charger Stars & Stripes Edition 
 2019 Fiat 124 Spider Urbana Edition 
 2020 Ford Escape
 2020 Ford Mustang Ecoboost High Performance Package 
 2020 Hyundai Venue
 2019 Infiniti Q50 Signature Edition 
 2019 Kia Stinger GTS 
 2020 Lincoln Corsair
 2020 Mercedes-AMG A 35 Sedan 
 2020 Mercedes-AMG CLA 35
 2020 Mercedes-AMG GLC 63 (refresh) 
 2020 Mercedes-Benz EQC Edition 1886 
 2020 Mercedes-Benz GLC-Class Coupe (refresh) 
 2020 Mercedes-Benz GLS-Class
 2020 Nissan 370Z, GT-R 50th Anniversary Edition 
 2020 Nissan Versa
 2019 Porsche 911 (991) Speedster 
 2019 Ram 2500HD/3500HD Kentucky Derby Edition 
 2020 Subaru Outback
 2020 Toyota Highlander
 2020 Toyota Yaris Hatchback

North American debuts

 2019 Alfa Romeo Giulia, Stelvio NRING 
 2019 Audi Q3
 2020 Audi R8 (refresh), R8 V10 Decennium
 2019 Audi TT RS (refresh) 
 2020 Bugatti Chiron Sport "110 Ans Bugatti" 
 2020 Hyundai Sonata
 2020 Jaguar XE (refresh) 
 2020 Koenigsegg Jesko
 2019 Mazda CX-5 Signature AWD Diesel 
 Qiantu K50 EV (by Mullen) 
 2020 Range Rover Velar SVAutobiography

Concept car introductions

World debuts

 Genesis Mint
 Kia Habaniro
 Volkswagen Atlas Basecamp Concept

North American debuts

 Volkswagen ID Buggy
 Volkswagen Tarok concept

2018
The 2018 show was held from March 30 through April 8, with press preview days on March 28 and 29.

Production car introductions

World debuts

 2019 Acura MDX A-Spec 
 2019 Acura RDX (production version) 
 2018 Alfa Romeo Giulia, Stelvio Nero Edizione 
 2019 Audi RS5 Sportback 
 2019 Cadillac CT6 (refresh) 
 2019 Cadillac XT4
 2018 Fiat 500 Urbana Edition 
 2019 Ford Fusion (refresh) 
 2019 GMC Acadia, Terrain Black Editions 
 2019 GMC Sierra AT4 
 2019 Honda Insight (production version) 
 2019 Hyundai Tucson (refresh) 
 2019 Infiniti QX60, QX80 Limited 
 2019 Jaguar F-Pace SVR 
 2019 Kia K900
 2019 Kia Sedona (refresh) 
 2019 Maserati Levante Trofeo 
 2019 Mazda CX-3 (refresh) 
 2019 Mercedes-AMG C43 Coupe, Cabriolet (refresh) 
 2019 Mercedes-AMG C63, C63 S (refresh) 
 2019 Mercedes-Benz C-Class Coupe, Cabriolet (refresh) 
 2019 Nissan Altima
 2019 Subaru Forester
 2019 Toyota RAV4
 2019 Toyota Yaris Sedan (refresh)

North American debuts

2019 Audi A6
2019 Audi R8 Rear-Wheel-Series 
2019 BMW X4
2019 Bugatti Chiron Sport 
2019 Genesis G70
2019 Hyundai Kona Electric
2019 Hyundai Santa Fe
2019 Jaguar I-Pace
2019 Kia Optima (refresh) 
2019 Land Rover Range Rover SV Coupe 
2019 Lamborghini Huracan Performante Spyder 
2019 Lexus RC F Sport Black Line 
2019 Lexus UX
2019 Mercedes-AMG G63
2019 Mercedes-AMG GT 4-Door 
2019 Porsche 911 GT3RS (refresh)
2019 Rimac C Two
2019 Toyota Corolla Hatchback
2019 Volkswagen Arteon R-Line package
2019 Volvo V60
2019 Volvo XC40 Inscription

Concept car introductions

World debuts

Genesis Essentia 
Lincoln Aviator (production preview) 
Mini Cooper S E Countryman Panamericana ALL4
Mini Electric Classic Cooper 
Volkswagen Atlas Cross Sport concept 
Volkswagen Atlas Tanoak truck concept

North American debuts

 Mazda Kai 
 Mini John Cooper Works GP Concept

2017
The 2017 show was held from April 14 through April 23, with press preview days on April 12 and 13.

Production car introductions

World debuts

 2018 Acura TLX (refresh) 
 2018 Audi R8 Audi Sport special edition 
 2018 Buick Enclave
 2018 Buick Regal
 2018 Chevrolet Corvette Carbon 65 Edition
 2018 Chevrolet Tahoe, Suburban RST 
 2018 Dodge Challenger SRT Demon 
 2018 Ford Explorer (refresh) 
 2018 Ford Fusion Police Responder Hybrid Sedan 
 2017 Honda Civic Si (production-spec) 
 2018 Honda Clarity PHEV and EV 
 2018 Jeep Grand Cherokee TrackHawk 
 2017 Jeep Wrangler Chief, Smokey Mountain special editions 
 2018 Koenigsegg Agera RS1 
 2018 Lexus LS 500 F Sport 
 2018 Lincoln Navigator
 2018 Maserati Ghibli Nerissimo 
 2018 Mercedes-AMG GLC63, GLC63 Coupe, GLC63 S Coupe 
 2018 Mitsubishi Outlander Sport (refresh) 
 2018 Nissan 370Z Heritage Edition 
 2017 Ram 1500 Sublime Sport, Rebel Blue Streak
 2018 Subaru Outback (refresh) 
 2018 Toyota Sienna (refresh)

North American debuts

 2018 Alfa Romeo Stelvio (base model, Ti) 
 2018 Audi RS 3 (sedan) 
 2018 Audi RS 5 (coupe) 
 2018 Audi TT RS 
 2017 BMW 4-Series (refresh) 
 2017 Honda Civic Type R
 2018 Hyundai Sonata (refresh) 
 2018 Infiniti Q50 (refresh) 
 2018 Jaguar F-Type (refresh) 
 2018 Kia Rio
 2018 Lamborghini Huracán Performante 
 2018 Maserati GranTurismo Sport Special Edition 
 2018 Mercedes-AMG E63 Wagon 
 2018 Mercedes-Benz E-Class Cabriolet 
 2017 Nissan GT-R Track Edition 
 2018 Porsche 911 GT3, GTS (refresh) 
 2018 Porsche Panamera Sport Turismo, Turbo S E-Hybrid 
 2018 Range Rover Velar
 2019 Spyker C8 Preliator Spyder 
 2018 Subaru XV/Crosstrek
 2018 Toyota Yaris (refresh) 
 2018 Volkswagen Golf GTI, Wagon, Alltrack, R (refresh) 
 2018 Volvo S90, S90L T8 PHEV 
 2018 Volvo XC60

Concept car introductions

World debuts

 Genesis GV80 Fuel Cell Concept 
 Infiniti QX80 Monograph 
 Nissan GT-R Copzilla 
 Nissan Rogue Dogue Project Vehicle 
 Nissan Rogue Trail Warrior Project 
 Subaru Ascent SUV Concept 
 Toyota FT-4X

North American debuts

 Mercedes-AMG GT Concept

Race car introductions

 Audi R8 LMS GT4

2016
The 2016 show was held from March 25 through April 3, with press preview days on March 23 and 24.

Production car introductions

World debuts

 2017 Acura MDX (refresh)
2017 Audi R8 Spyder
2017 Buick Enclave Sport Touring Edition
 2017 Buick Encore (refresh)
 2017 Chevrolet Camaro ZL1
 2017 Chevrolet Sonic (refresh)
 2017 Chrysler 300S w/ Sport Appearance Packages
2016 Ford Shelby Mustang GT-H
2017 GMC Terrain Nightfall Edition
2017 Infiniti QX70 Limited
2017 Jeep Grand Cherokee Summit (refresh)
2017 Jeep Grand Cherokee Trailhawk
2017 Mazda MX-5 RF
2017 Mercedes-AMG C63 Cabriolet
 2017 Mercedes-AMG E43
2017 Mercedes-AMG GLC43, GLC43 Coupe
 2017 Mercedes-Benz CLA-Class (refresh)
2017 Mercedes-Benz GLC Coupe
2017 Mini Clubman ALL4
2017 Mini John Cooper Works Convertible
 2017 Nissan GT-R (refresh)
2017 Nissan Titan
 2016 Scion tC RS 10.0 (Barcelona Red)
 2017 Subaru Impreza
 2017 Toyota 86 (refresh of Scion FR-S)
 2017 Toyota Corolla 50th Anniversary Special Edition
 2017 Toyota Highlander (refresh)
2017 Toyota Prius Prime (PHEV)

North American debuts

 2017 Alfa Romeo Giulia, Giulia Ti
 2017 BMW Alpina B7 xDrive
 2017 BMW M760i xDrive
 2017 BMW 330e iPerformance
2017 Fiat 124 Spider Elaborazione Abarth
2017 Honda Clarity FCV (US spec)
2017 Hyundai Ioniq Hybrid, Plug-in, Electric
 2017 Jaguar F-Type SVR
2017 Kia Cadenza
2017 Koenigsegg Regera
2018 Lexus LC500h
2017 Maserati Levante
2017 Mitsubishi Mirage G4 Sedan
2017 Mitsubishi Outlander PHEV
 2017 Porsche 718 Boxster
 2017 Porsche 911 R
 2017 Porsche Macan (I4 turbo)
2017 Rolls-Royce Ghost and Wraith Black Badge
 2017 Spyker C8 Preliator
 2017 Volkswagen Golf Alltrack
 2017 Volvo XC90 Excellence (US debut)

Concept car introductions

World debuts

 Genesis New York Concept
 Lincoln Navigator Concept

North American debuts

 2017 Honda Civic Hatchback Prototype
 Volkswagen BUDD-e (US auto show debut)

Race car introductions 

 Acura NSX GT3
 Honda Civic Coupe GRC

2015
The 2015 show was held from April 3 through April 12, with press preview days on April 1 and 2.

Production car introductions

World debuts

 2016 Buick Enclave Tuscan Edition
 2016 Cadillac CT6
 2016 Chevrolet Malibu
 2016 Chevrolet Spark
 2016 GMC Terrain (refresh)
 2016 Infiniti QX50 (refresh)
 2016 Jaguar XF
 2016 Kia Optima
 2016 Lexus RX
 2016 Mazda MX-5 Club
 2016 McLaren 570S
 2016 Mercedes-Benz GLE-Class (refresh)
 2016 Mitsubishi Outlander (refresh)
 2016 Nissan Maxima
 2016 Porsche Boxster Spyder
 2016 Range Rover SVAutobiography
 2016 Range Rover Sport HST Limited Edition
 2016 Scion iA
 2016 Scion iM
 2016 Toyota RAV4 Hybrid

North American debuts

 Aston Martin Vulcan
 2016 BMW Alpina B6 xDrive Gran Coupe (refresh)
 2016 Ford Focus RS
 2016 Hyundai Tucson
 2016 Smart Fortwo
 2016 Mercedes-AMG G65

Concept car introductions

World debuts
 Honda Civic (10th generation) Concept
 Lincoln Continental Concept
 Subaru BRZ STi Performance Concept

North American debuts
 Infiniti QX30 Concept

Race car introductions
 Acura ILX Endurance Racer 
 Subaru WRX STi Rallycross car (VT15x)

2014
The 2014 show was held from April 18 through April 27, with press preview days on April 16 and 17.

Production car introductions

World debuts

 2015 Acura TLX (production version)
 2015 Aston Martin DB9 Carbon Edition
 2015 Aston Martin Vantage GT
 2014–15 Audi RS 7 Dynamic Edition
 2015 BMW M4 Convertible
 2015 BMW X4
 2015 Chevrolet Corvette Z06 Convertible
 2015 Chevrolet Cruze (facelift)
 2015 Dodge Challenger (facelift)
 2015 Dodge Charger (refresh)
 2015 Ford Focus (4-door sedan), Focus Electric (facelift)
 2015 Ford Mustang 50 Year Limited Edition
 2015 Infiniti Q70 (facelift)
 2015 Infiniti QX80 (facelift), QX80 Limited
 2015 Kia Sedona
 2015 Mazda MX-5 Miata 25th Anniversary Edition
 2015 Mercedes-Benz S63 AMG Coupé
 2015 Mini Countryman (facelift)
 2015 Nissan Murano
 2015 Nissan Versa (facelift)
 2014 Scion FR-S RS 1.0
 2014 Scion xB RS 10.0 (Electric Quartz)
 2015 Subaru Outback
 2015 Toyota Camry (refresh)
 2015 Volkswagen Jetta (facelift)

North American debuts

 2015 Alfa Romeo 4C
 2016 Audi A3 Sportback TDI
 2015 BMW 4 Series Gran Coupé
 2015 BMW Alpina B6 xDrive Gran Coupe
 2015 Chevrolet Trax (U.S. debut)
 2015 Ford Focus (5-door hatchback) (facelift)
 2015 Hyundai Sonata
 2015 Jeep Renegade

Concept car introductions

World debuts

 Ford Transit Skyliner
 Land Rover Discovery Vision Concept

North American debuts

 BMW Concept X5 eDrive
 Volkswagen Golf SportWagen (pre-production concept)

2013
The 2013 show was held from March 29 through April 7, with press preview days on March 27 and 28.

Production car introductions

World debuts

 2014 Acura MDX
 2015 Audi A3 and S3 sedan (press-only preview)
 2014 Buick LaCrosse (facelift)
 2014 Buick Regal (facelift)
 2014 Cadillac CTS
 2014 Chevrolet Camaro (facelift), Camaro Z/28
 2014 Chevrolet SS
 2014 Dodge Durango (facelift)
 2014 Honda Odyssey (facelift)
 2014 Hyundai Equus (facelift)
 2014 Infiniti QX60 Hybrid
 2014 Jaguar XJR
 2014 Jaguar XKR-S GT
 2014 Jeep Cherokee
 2014 Kia Forte Koup
 2014 Kia Optima (facelift)
 2014 Kia Soul
 2014 Mercedes-Benz B-Class Electric Drive
 2014 Mercedes-Benz CLA45 AMG
 2014 Nissan Pathfinder Hybrid
 2014 Range Rover Sport
 2014 Scion tC (facelift)
 2013 Shelby 1000 S/C
 2014 Subaru XV Crosstrek Hybrid
 2014 Toyota Highlander
 2014 Volvo S60, V60, and XC60 R-Design

North American debuts

 2014 BMW 3 Gran Turismo
 2014 Chevrolet Corvette Stingray Convertible
 2014 Mitsubishi Mirage
 2014 Porsche 911 GT3
 Rolls-Royce Wraith
 2015 Volkswagen Golf
 2014 Volvo S60, S80, XC60, and XC70 (facelifts)

Concept car introductions

World debuts
 Subaru WRX Concept

North American debuts
Audi A3 Sportback e-tron concept
 BMW Concept Active Tourer

2012
The 2012 show was held from April 6 through April 15, with press preview days on April 4 and 5.

Production car introductions

World debuts

 2013 BMW X1 (facelift)
 2013 Buick Enclave (facelift)
 2013 Cadillac SRX (facelift)
 2014 Chevrolet Impala
 2013 Chevrolet Traverse (facelift)
 2013 Ford Explorer Sport
 2013 GMC Terrain Denali
 2013 Hyundai Santa Fe Sport
 2013 Lexus ES
 2013 Lincoln MKZ
 2013 Mercedes-Benz GL-Class (X166)
 2013 Mercedes-Benz GLK-Class (facelift)
 2013 Mercedes-Benz SL65 AMG
 2013 Mitsubishi Outlander Sport
 2013 Nissan Altima 
Ram 1500 (facelift)
 2013 Shelby 1000
 2013 SRT Viper
 2013 Subaru Legacy (facelift)
 2013 Subaru Outback (facelift)
 2013 Subaru XV Crosstrek
 2013 Toyota Avalon

North American debuts

 2012 BMW M6
 2013 Lexus RX 350 F Sport
 Mini Countryman John Cooper Works
 2013 Porsche Cayenne Diesel
 2013 Toyota Venza (facelift)

Concept car introductions

World debuts
 Acura RLX concept
 DeLorean Electric
 Fisker Atlantic
 Honda Crosstour concept
 Infiniti LE

North American debuts
 Mazda Takeri
 Volkswagen (Passat) Alltrack concept

Nissan also introduced the 2014 Nissan NV200 Taxi, the New York City "Taxi of Tomorrow", on the evening before show press days began.  It was on display at the show as well.

2011
The 2011 show was held from April 22 through May 1, with press preview days on April 20 and April 21.

Production car introductions

World debuts
 2013 Chevrolet Malibu ECO
 2012 Chevrolet Sonic Z-Spec accessories
 2011 Chrysler 200 S sedan, S convertible
 2012 Chrysler 300 SRT8, S, C Executive Series
 2012 Dodge Avenger R/T
 2012 Dodge Charger Mopar Edition
 2013 Ford Taurus
 2012 Honda Civic
 2012 Jaguar XF (facelift)
 2012 Jeep Grand Cherokee SRT8
 2012 Kia Rio sedan
 2012 Kia Soul
 2012 Mercedes-Benz C63 AMG Coupe
 2012 Nissan Versa
 2012 Porsche Panamera Turbo S
 2012 Shelby GTS
 2012 Shelby GT500 Super Snake
 2012 Subaru Impreza

North American debuts
 2012 BMW 6 Series Coupe
 2013 Chevrolet Malibu
 2012 Fiat 500C
 2012 Hyundai Accent (U.S. debut)
 Lotus Evora S, IPS
 2012 Mazda3 (U.S. debut)
 2012 Volkswagen Beetle

Concept car introductions

World debuts
 Dodge Avenger Mopar/Magneti Marelli Rally Car
 Lexus LF-Gh
 Nissan Leaf NISMO RC
 Scion FR-S Concept
 Suzuki Kizashi Apex Concept
 Suzuki Kizashi EcoCharge Concept

North American debuts
 Infiniti IPL G Convertible concept
 Mazda Minagi
 Mercedes-Benz A-Class Concept
 Saab PhoeniX
 Volkswagen Bulli

Infiniti announced production of the JX mid-size crossover, to be revealed as a concept at the Pebble Beach Concours d'Elegance in August, and in production form at the LA Auto Show in November. Mazda announced production of the 2013 CX-5 compact crossover, to be revealed at the Frankfurt Motor Show in September.

2010
The 2010 show was held from April 2 through April 11, with press preview days on March 31 and April 1.

Production car introductions

World debuts

 2011 Acura TSX Sport Wagon
 2011 BMW X5
 2011 Cadillac CTS-V Sport Wagon
 2011 Chevrolet Cruze Eco
 2011 Chevrolet Cruze RS 
 2011 Hyundai Sonata Hybrid
 2011 Hyundai Sonata 2.0T
 2011 Infiniti QX56
 2011 Kia Forte five-door
 2011 Kia Optima
 2011 Kia Sorento SX
 2011 Lincoln MKZ Hybrid
 2011 Mercedes-Benz R-Class
 2011 Scion iQ
 2011 Scion tC
 2011 Subaru Impreza WRX
 2011 Subaru Impreza WRX STI
 2011 Suzuki Kizashi Sport

North American debuts

 2011 BMW 335is
 2011 Hyundai Equus
 2011 Kia Sportage
 2011 Lexus CT200h
 2011 Mercedes-Benz E-Class Wagon
 2011 Mini Countryman
 2011 Mitsubishi Outlander Sport
 2011 Nissan Juke
 2011 Volkswagen Touareg / Touareg Hybrid
 2011 Volvo S60

2009
The 2009 show was held from April 10 until April 19, with press preview days on April 8 and April 9.

Production car introductions

 2010 Bentley Continental Supersports (North American debut)
 2010 BMW 760Li
 2010 BMW X6 M
 2010 GMC Terrain
 2010 GMC Yukon Denali Hybrid
 2011 Jeep Grand Cherokee
 2010 Kia Forte Koup
 2010 Land Rover LR4
 2010 Land Rover Range Rover
 2010 Land Rover Range Rover Sport
 2010 Mazdaspeed3 (North American debut)
 2010 Mazda CX-7 (United States debut)
 2010 Mazda CX-9
 2010 Mercedes-Benz E63 AMG
 2010 Mercedes-Benz ML450 Hybrid
 2009 Nissan Nismo 370Z
 2010 Nissan 370Z Roadster
 2010 Porsche 911 GT3 (North American debut)
 2010 Subaru Legacy
 2010 Subaru Outback
 2010 Volkswagen GTI

Concept car introductions

Acura ZDX Concept
 Ford Transit Connect Family One Concept
 Mercedes-Benz E250 BlueTec Concept
 Mitsubishi Outlander GT Prototype
Hyundai Nuvis
Scion iQ Concept
 General Motors/Segway PUMA (Personal Urban Mobility and Accessibility)

2008
The 2008 show was held from March 21 until March 30, with press preview days on March 19 and March 20.

Production car introductions

 2009 Acura TSX
 2009 Dodge Challenger
 2009 Honda Fit (North American debut)
 2009 Hyundai Genesis Coupe
 2009 Kia Optima
 2009 Mercedes-Benz M-Class
 2009 Nissan Maxima
 2009 Pontiac G8 GXP
 2010 Pontiac G8 sport truck
 2009 Pontiac Solstice Coupe
 2008 Porsche Boxster RS60 Spyder (North American debut)
 2009 Volvo XC60 (North American debut)

Concept car introductions
 Ford Transit Connect Taxi Concept
 Kia Koup
 Nissan Cube Denki, Quazé, Nielus concepts
 Saab 9-X BioHybrid (North American debut)
 Scion Hako Coupe
 Suzuki Kizashi 3
 Saleen S5S Raptor

2007
The 2007 show was held from April 6 until April 15, with press preview days on April 4 and April 5.

Production car introductions

 2008 Audi R8
 2008 Audi TT
 2008 Bentley Brooklands
 2008 BMW 5 Series
 2009 BMW M3
 2008 Buick LaCrosse Super
 2008 Buick Lucerne Super
 2008 Cadillac STS
 2008 Callaway C16 Convertible
 2008 Ford Expedition Funkmaster Flex Edition
 2009 Ford Flex
 2008 Ford Shelby GT500KR
 2008 Ford F-150 Foose Edition
 2008 Honda S2000 CR
 2008 Hummer H2
 2008 Hummer H3 Alpha
 2008 Infiniti G37 coupe
 2008 Jeep Grand Cherokee
 2008 Jeep Liberty
 2008 Lexus LX 570
 2008 Mercedes-Benz CL65 AMG
 2008 Mercedes-Benz CLK63 AMG Black Series
 2008 Mercedes-Benz C-Class
 2007 Nissan Nismo 350Z
 2008 Porsche 911 Turbo Cabriolet
 2008 Subaru Impreza
 2008 Subaru Impreza WRX
 2008 Subaru Tribeca
 2008 Suzuki SX4
 2008 Volkswagen Jetta Sportwagen
 2008 Volkswagen Touareg 2
 2008 Volvo V70 Wagon
 2008 Volvo XC70

Concept car introductions

Chevrolet Beat Concept
Chevrolet Groove Concept
Chevrolet Trax Concept
 Hyundai Genesis Concept
 Infiniti EX
Lexus LF-A Concept
Toyota FT-HS
Mazda Nagare

2006

The 2006 show was held from April 14 until April 23, with press preview days on April 12 and April 13.

Production car introductions

 2007 Acura RDX
 2007 Audi A4/S4 Cabriolet
 2007 Audi TT
 2007 Bentley Continental GTC
 2007 BMW Z4/M Coupe
 2007 Chrysler 300 Extended Wheelbase
 2006 Ford Shelby GT-H
 2007 Hyundai Elantra
 2007 Infiniti G35 sedan
 2007 Jeep Patriot
 2007 Jeep Wrangler Unlimited
 2007 Kia Sorento
 2007 Lexus LS 600h L
 2007 Mazda CX-9
 2006 Mazdaspeed3 (North American introduction)
 2007 Mercedes-Benz E-Class
 2006 MINI Cooper Works GP
 2007 Mitsubishi Outlander
 2007 Nissan Altima
 2007 Nissan Maxima
 2007 Saleen/Parnelli Jones Limited Edition Mustang
 2007 Saturn Aura
 2007 Saturn Outlook
 2007 Saturn Sky Red Line
 2006 Scion tC RS 2.0 (Blue Blitz Mica)
 2007 Subaru Impreza WRX STI Limited
 2007 Subaru Legacy Spec B
 2007 Suzuki XL-7
 2007 Volvo XC90

Concept car introductions

 Acura MDX Concept
 Honda Element SC Concept
 Pontiac G6 GXP Concept
 Saturn PreVUE
Scion Fuse

2005

The 2005 show saw the following introductions:

Production car introductions

 2006 Bentley Continental Flying Spur
 2006 BMW 325i
 2006 Chevrolet TrailBlazer SS
 2006 Chevrolet Malibu 
 2006 Chevrolet Malibu Maxx SS
 2006 Cadillac XLR-V
 2006 Dodge Charger SRT-8
 2006 Ferrari F430 Spyder
 2005 Ford GT
 2006 Hyundai Accent
 2006 Hyundai Azera
 2006 Isuzu i-Series
 2006 Jeep Commander
 2006 Jeep Grand Cherokee SRT-8
 2006 Lexus GS 450h
 2006 Lexus IS
 2006 Mercedes-Benz R-Class
 2005 Mitsubishi Lancer Evolution
 2006 Shelby Cobra GT500 (Ford Mustang)
 2006 Subaru Forester 2.5 XT Limited
 2006 Subaru Forester L.L. Bean Edition

Concept car introductions

 Ford Explorer Sport Trac Adrenalin SVC Concept
 Nissan Sport Concept
 Scion t2B
 Suzuki Concept X2

2004
The 2004 show saw the following introductions:

Production car introductions

 2005 Audi A6 4.2
 2005 Bentley Arnage T
 2005 Cadillac STS
 2005 Ford Escape Hybrid
 2005 Infiniti Q45 
 2005 Jaguar XJ
 2005 Jeep Grand Cherokee
 2005 Jeep Liberty
 2005 Kia Spectra
 2005 Land Rover LR3
 2005 Mercedes-Benz SL65 AMG
 2005 Mini Cooper Convertible
 2005 Nissan Altima SE-R
 2005 Nissan Xterra
 2005 Saab 9-7X
 2005 Suzuki Forenza Wagon

Concept car introductions

 Acura RL Prototype
 Audi RSQ
 Buick Velite
 Infiniti M45 Concept
 Lexus LF-C
 Lincoln Zephyr Concept

2003
The 2003 show saw the following introductions:

Production car introductions

World debuts

 Mitsubishi Diamante (being the export version of the Australian-made Mitsubishi Magna)

Concept car introductions

 Acura TL
 300C
 Lexus HPX
 Toyota Prius (XW20)

2002
The 2002 show saw the following introductions:

International debuts

 2003 Buick Park Avenue (facelift)
 2004 Chrysler Pacifica
 2003 Ford Crown Victoria (facelift)
 2003 Ford Power Rangers Auto Mighty Dragon Mobile
 2003 Honda Element
 2003 Infiniti G35
 2003 Infiniti M45
 2003 Land Rover Discovery (facelift)
 2003 Lincoln Aviator
 2003 Nissan Murano
 2003 Saturn Ion
 2003 Saturn L-Series (facelift)

North American debuts

 Mazda 6 Estate

2001
The 2001 show saw the following introductions:

International debuts

 Acura RSX
 Ford Focus S2
 Ford Focus ZX5
 Honda Civic Si
 Infiniti I35
 Land Rover Discovery Series II Kalahari
 Mitsubishi Lancer
 Nissan Altima
 Subaru Outback H6-3.0 VDC Sedan

North American debuts

 Aston Martin V12 Vanquish
 Audi A4
 Jaguar X-Type
 Kia Sedona
 Mercedes-Benz C-Class SportsCoupe
 Mercedes-Benz G500

Concept car introductions

 Chrysler PT Cruiser Convertible Concept
 Land Rover Freelander Kensington Concept
 Lincoln MK9 Concept
 Hummer H2 SUT Concept
 Hyundai LZ450 Study
 Nissan Chappo
 Suzuki SX Concept
 Toyota Roxy ECHO Concept
 Toyota Matrix Race Car Concept

2000
The 2000 show saw the following introductions:

International debuts
 Lexus SC430
Chevrolet Venture (facelift)
Chrysler Sebring (convertible)
Infiniti Q45
Panoz Esperante

Concept cars

 Kia Rio SV Concept

1999

International debuts

 Ford Taurus
 Acura RL
 BMW 323Ci
 BMW 328Ci
 Buick Century 2000
 Chevrolet Cavalier Convertible
 Chevrolet Cavalier Sedan
 Chevrolet Cavalier Z24 Coupe
 Chevrolet Monte Carlo SS
 Infiniti I30
 Mazda MPV
 Mitsubishi Eclipse
 Mitsubishi Montero Sport
 Nissan Pathfinder
 Oldsmobile Aurora
 Pontiac Sunfire
 Pontiac Firebird Trans Am "30th Anniversary"
 Pontiac Firebird Trans Am "30th Anniversary" Daytona 500 Pace Car
 Pontiac Firebird Trans Am Convertible "30th Anniversary"
 Saab 9-3 Viggen
 Saturn L-Series
 Subaru Legacy GT (sedan and wagon)
 Volvo S80

Concept car introductions

 Chevrolet Suburban Show Truck
 Dodge Caravan R/T Concept
 GMC Yukon Show Truck
 Isuzu VX-O2 Concept
 Nissan Tino Concept

1998
 Chevrolet Tracker
 Mitsubishi SST Spyder Concept
 Audi A6 Avant
Callaway C12
 Chevrolet Tracker Convertible
Infiniti G20
 Infiniti Hot Rod
Isuzu Amigo Hardtop
 Kia Sportage Convertible
 Lincoln LS6/8
 Honda Odyssey
 Hyundai Avatar Concept
Mitsubishi Galant
 Pontiac Grand Am GT
 Porsche 911 Cabriolet
 Subaru Impreza 2.5RS
Suzuki Grand Vitara
Volvo S40
 Volvo V40

1997
 Lincoln Town Car
 Audi A4 Avant
 Chevrolet Prizm
 Isuzu VehiCROSS
 Mazda 626 Sedan
 Mitsubishi Diamante SSC Concept
 Nissan Frontier
 Porsche 911 Turbo S
 Subaru Impreza 2.5 RS

1996

 Chevrolet Venture
 Jaguar XK8 Convertible
 Mazda Miata M Coupe Concept
Oldsmobile Silhouette
Pontiac Trans Sport
 Subaru Legacy 2.5 GT
 Subaru Legacy Outback Limited
 Subaru Impreza Outback Sport

1994

Production car introductions

 Chevrolet Cavalier Sedan
 Chevrolet Cavalier Coupe
Ford Contour
Mercury Mystique
Subaru Legacy
 Subaru Legacy Outback

Concept car introductions

 Ford Powerstroke Concept
 Mitsubishi Eclipse Convertible Concept

1993

 Lincoln Continental 
 Alfa Romeo 164 LS
Infiniti Q45
Mazda AZ-1 Concept
 Mercury Villager Nautica
 Porsche 911 Carrera 4
Saab 900
Saab 900 Coupe

1992

 Cadillac Fleetwood Brougham
 BMW 525i Sport Touring Wagon
 IsoRivolta Grifo Grand Touring Coupe
 Nissan Pickup
 Mitsubishi/Boyd Aluma Coupe Concept
Vector Avtech WX-3
Vector Avtech WX-3R
 Volkswagen Passat GLX

1991

Acura Vigor
 BMW M5
 Cadillac Seville SLS
 Cadillac Seville STS
 Cadillac Eldorado
 Hyundai Elantra
Mazda MX-3
 Mitsubishi 3000GT Premier Edition VR-4
 Porsche 911 Carrera Supercharged Strosek C2

1989

 Dodge Viper RT/10 Concept
GMC Syclone Concept
 Oldsmobile California Trofeo

1969

 Buick Century Cruiser Concept
 Bob Reisner Milk Truck
 Bob Reisner 'the Bathtub'
 Bob Reisner Invader
Lamborghini Miura
 Oldsmobile 442 Convertible
 Rowan Electric

1968
 AMC AMX-GT

1959 

 Daimler Dart prototype

1950 
 Aston Martin DB2

References

External links

 New York International Auto Show (official site)
 New York Auto Show Guide – About.com
 All news about New York Auto Show 2015
 Photos from New York Auto Show (2000–present)
 New York Auto Show 2009 Mahalo Archive
 Semicultured.com Photo Essay

Auto show
Auto shows in the United States
Recurring events established in 1900
1900 establishments in New York City